Woodbridge "Woody" Metcalf (June 23, 1888 in Grosse Pointe, Michigan – July 11, 1972 in Berkeley, California) was an American forester and Olympic sailor in the Star class. He competed in the 1932 Summer Olympics together with William Glenn Waterhouse, where they finished 5th.

References

External links
 
 
 

1888 births
1972 deaths
Olympic sailors of the United States
American male sailors (sport)
Star class sailors
Sailors at the 1936 Summer Olympics – Star
Star class world champions
World champions in sailing for the United States